This article is intended to give an overview of telecommunications in the Netherlands.

Mail 

The postal service in the Netherlands is performed by PostNL in most cases—which has, as of 2008, a monopoly on letters lighter than 50 g. The monopoly is planned to expire in 2009. PostNL's competitors include Selekt Mail and Sandd. Post offices that are owned by Postbank and TNT Post have been earmarked for closure between 2008 and 2013.

Postal codes in the Netherlands are formed of four digits then two letters (in capitals), separated by a space—, for example.

Telephone

Telephones - main lines in use:
8.000.000 (2007)

Telephones - mobile cellular subscribers:
17.200.000 (2007)

Telephone system:
general assessment: highly developed and well maintained

domestic: extensive fixed-line fiber-optic network; cellular telephone system is one of the largest in Europe with three major network operators utilizing the third generation of the Global System for Mobile Communications (GSM).

international:
9 submarine cables; satellite earth stations - 3 Intelsat (1 Indian Ocean and 2 Atlantic Ocean), 1 Eutelsat, and 1 Inmarsat (Atlantic and Indian Ocean regions) (2004)

Area codes

 010 – Rotterdam
 0111 – Zierikzee
 0113 – Goes
 0114 – Hulst
 0115 – Terneuzen
 0117 – Oostburg
 0118 – Middelburg
 013 – Tilburg
 015 – Delft
 0161 – Rijen
 0162 – Oosterhout
 0164 – Bergen op Zoom
 0165 – Roosendaal
 0166 – Tholen
 0167 – Steenbergen
 0168 – Zevenbergen
 0172 – Alphen aan den Rijn
 0174 – Naaldwijk
 0180 – Ridderkerk
 0181 – Spijkenisse
 0182 – Gouda
 0183 – Gorinchem
 0184 – Sliedrecht
 0186 – Oud-Beijerland
 0187 – Middelharnis
 020 – Amsterdam
 0222 – Texel
 0223 – Den Helder
 0224 – Schagen
 0226 – Noord-Scharwoude
 0227 – Middenmeer
 0228 – Enkhuizen
 0229 – Hoorn
 023 – Haarlem
 024 – Nijmegen
 0251 – Beverwijk
 0252 – Hillegom
 0255 – IJmuiden
 026 – Arnhem
 0294 – Weesp
 0297 – Aalsmeer
 0299 – Purmerend
 030 – Utrecht
 0313 – Dieren
 0314 – Doetinchem
 0315 – Terborg
 0316 – Zevenaar
 0317 – Wageningen
 0318 – Ede
 0320 – Lelystad
 0321 – Dronten
 033 – Amersfoort
 0341 – Harderwijk
 0342 – Barneveld
 0343 – Doorn
 0344 – Tiel
 0345 – Culemborg
 0346 – Maarssen
 0347 – Vianen
 0348 – Woerden
 035 – Hilversum
 036 – Almere
 038 – Zwolle
 040 – Eindhoven
 0411 – Boxtel
 0412 – Oss
 0413 – Veghel
 0416 – Waalwijk
 0418 – Zaltbommel
 043 – Maastricht
 045 – Heerlen
 046 – Sittard
 0475 – Roermond
 0478 – Venray
 0481 – Bemmel
 0485 – Cuijk
 0486 – Grave
 0487 – Druten
 0488 – Zetten
 0492 – Helmond
 0493 – Deurne
 0495 – Weert
 0497 – Reusel
 0499 – Best
 050 – Groningen
 0511 – Veenwouden
 0512 – Drachten
 0513 – Heerenveen
 0514 – Balk
 0515 – Sneek
 0516 – Oosterwolde
 0517 – Franeker
 0518 – St. Annaparochie
 0519 – Dokkum
 0521 – Steenwijk
 0522 – Meppel
 0523 – Dedemsvaart
 0524 – Coevorden
 0525 – Elburg
 0527 – Emmeloord
 0528 – Hoogeveen
 0529 – Ommen
 053 – Enschede
 0541 – Oldenzaal
 0543 – Winterswijk
 0544 – Groenlo/Lichtenvoorde
 0545 – Neede
 0546 – Almelo
 0547 – Goor
 0548 – Rijssen
 055 – Apeldoorn
 0561 – Wolvega
 0562 – Terschelling/Vlieland
 0566 – Irnsum
 0570 – Deventer
 0571 – Voorst
 0572 – Raalte
 0573 – Lochem
 0575 – Zutphen
 0577 – Uddel
 0578 – Epe
 058 – Leeuwarden
 0591 – Emmen
 0592 – Assen
 0593 – Beilen
 0594 – Zuidhorn
 0595 – Warffum
 0596 – Appingedam
 0597 – Winschoten
 0598 – Hoogezand
 0599 – Stadskanaal
 070 – The Hague (Den Haag/'s-Gravenhage)
 071 – Leiden
 072 – Alkmaar
 073 – 's-Hertogenbosch
 074 – Hengelo
 075 – Zaandam
 076 – Breda
 077 – Venlo
 078 – Dordrecht
 079 – Zoetermeer

Non-geographical codes

Starting with
06 - Mobile/Cell phones
066 - Pager numbers
0676 - Internet service provider dial-up line
0800 - Free service numbers
084 - Non-geographical personal numbers
085 - VoIP numbers
087 - Non-geographical personal numbers (also for VoIP use)
088 - Large companies with more than one address
0900 - Paid information numbers
0906 - Adult lines
0909 - Entertainment
091 - VoIP numbers (not yet in use)

Radio, television and internet

Radio broadcast stations:
AM 4, FM 58, shortwave 3 (1998)

Radios:
15.3 million (1996)

Television broadcast stations:
25

Televisions:
6.700.000 (2002, CBS)

Internet Service Providers (ISPs):
33 (2007)

Country code (Top level domain): .nl

Broadband Internet access

Countries, Federations and Special municipalities 
 Telecommunications in Aruba
 Telecommunications in the Caribbean Netherlands (Bonaire · Saba · Sint Eustatius)
 Telecommunications in Curaçao
 Telecommunications in Sint Maarten
 Telecommunications in the Netherlands Antilles (Defunct)

See also
Sim-only (in Dutch)

References

External links
De Telefoongids KPN telephone directory, combined white pages and yellow pages
Meer weten over sim only abonnementen? Lees meer over de voor- en nadelen (in Dutch).